Nkholo Victor "Tolly" Mashamaite (born 1975/1976) is a South African politician who has represented the African National Congress (ANC) in the Limpopo Provincial Legislature since 2018. He formerly served as Chairperson of Committees in the legislature from May 2019 until August 2021, when he was charged with corruption and stepped aside. He served on the Provincial Executive Committee of the ANC's Limpopo branch from 2018 to 2022.

ANC Waterberg Secretary 
Mashamaite was born in 1975 or 1976. He was formerly the Regional Secretary of the ANC's Waterberg regional branch, a position to which he was elected in December 2013. While he was in that office, in early October 2016, he was arrested and charged in the Mokopane Regional Court; the National Prosecuting Authority alleged that he had raped a woman at a hotel in Mokopone and had subsequently attempted to bribe her R400 to keep quiet about the incident. He was released on R1,000 bail but, at the strong recommendation of the ANC's national leadership and Tripartite Alliance partners, the Limpopo ANC suspended him from his party office. His suspension led to hostility between opposing factions of the party and the ANCs regional offices were ultimately closed indefinitely after a violent confrontation. On 5 December 2016, he was acquitted of the charges against him and was reinstated as ANC Regional Secretary.

In June 2018, Mashamaite was elected to a four-year term as a member of the Provincial Executive Committee of the Limpopo ANC. The following month, he was succeeded as Regional Secretary by Jacob Moabelo.

Provincial legislature 
On 8 August 2018, Mashamaite was sworn in to the Limpopo Provincial Legislature, filling a casual vacancy created when Soviet Lekganyane resigned to take up a full-time party position as ANC Provincial Secretary. He was appointed to chair the legislature's committee on ethics and members' interests. In the 2019 general election, he was elected to his first full term in the provincial legislature, ranked 19th on the ANC's provincial party list. When the legislature sat for the first time, he was named its Chairperson of Committees ("Chair of Chairs"), with Che Selane as his deputy.

In August 2021, the National Prosecuting Authority announced that Mashamaite faced corruption charges relating to multimillion-rand tender irregularities at the Mogalakwena Local Municipality between 2016 and 2019. He and his co-accused – who included former Mogalakwena Mayor Andrina Matsemela and Mashamaite's brother, Jabu Mashmaite, a Mogalakwena municipal employee – were charged with corruption, money laundering, and conspiracy to commit corruption.

While court proceedings were ongoing, the Limpopo ANC announced that it had removed Mashamaite from the Chairperson of Committees position, demoting him to an ordinary Member of the Provincial Legislature; it said the decision was in line with the national party's step-aside rule. At the provincial party's next elective conference, which occurred in June 2022 while Mashamaite was facing the corruption charges, he was not re-elected to the Provincial Executive Committee.

References

External links 

 

Living people
Members of the Limpopo Provincial Legislature
African National Congress politicians
21st-century South African politicians
Year of birth missing (living people)